Mohammad Ayub Chowdhury is a retired Major General of the Bangladesh Army, who served as the Director General of Department of Immigration and Passports, Dhaka.

Career 
Chowdhury was appointed the Director General of Department of Immigration & Passports on 29 July 2020 replacing Major General Shakil Ahmed. He paid homage to the shrine of Sheikh Mujibur Rahman in Gopalganj District after his appointment. He retired from his active service in October 2022.

References 

Living people
Bangladesh Army generals
Year of birth missing (living people)